Giorgio Capitani (29 December 1927 – 25 March 2017) was an Italian film director and screenwriter. He directed 40 films between 1954 and 2012. He also wrote for 12 films. He was born in Paris, France.

Selected filmography

 The Flame That Will Not Die (1949, dir. Vittorio Cottafavi)
 A Woman Has Killed (1952, dir. Vittorio Cottafavi)
 Milady and the Musketeers (1952, dir. Vittorio Cottafavi)
 For You I Have Sinned (1953, dir. Mario Costa)
 Piscatore 'e Pusilleco (1954)
 The Valiant (1962, dir. Roy Ward Baker)
 Axel Munthe, The Doctor of San Michele (1962)
 Samson and His Mighty Challenge (1964)
 The Ruthless Four (1968)
 The Archangel (1969)
 Sex Pot (1975)
 Pane, burro e marmellata (1977)
 Lobster for Breakfast (1979)
 I Hate Blondes (1980)

References

External links

1927 births
2017 deaths
Italian film directors
Italian screenwriters
Film people from Paris
Italian male screenwriters